Reuben J. Ursella (January 11, 1890 – February 1980) was a professional football player-coach who played during the early years of the National Football League. During his NFL career Rube played for the Minneapolis Marines, Akron Indians, Hammond Pros, Minneapolis Red Jackets and the Rock Island Independents. In January 1926, he also played exhibition games with Jim Thorpe and his independent team, the Tampa Cardinals. Ursella played college football for the University of Minnesota.

Biography
Rube began his professional football career in 1907 with the Minneapolis Marines. Rube Ursella was the true superstar of the team and had a long and successful pro football career with the Marines. He was both an offensive and defensive standout, as well as a skilled kicker and punter. Pro football shut down completely in 1918, due to the 1918 flu pandemic. In 1919 Walter Flanigan, the manager of the Rock Island Independents, was able to lure Ursella away from the Marines. With Rube came several other players as well as their offense which became known as "the Minnesota Shift". The team lost only one game that season, to the Hammond Pros. In 1921 Rube returned to the Marines, however the team was unable to play up to its previous level. He returned for two more seasons with the Independents in 1924 and 1925.

In January 1926, Rube joined the Tampa Cardinals a team put together by Jim Thorpe for the purpose of playing exhibition games in Florida. The team lost a New Year's Day game to Red Grange and the Chicago Bears and afterward played a series of games against the Millville Big Blue, playing under the banner of the Haven-Villa of Winter Haven.

During the 1926 season, Rube played for the Akron Indians and Hammond Pros before retiring at the end of the season. He returned in 1929 to play for the Minneapolis Red Jackets before retiring, for good, after that season.

References

 Rock Island Independents
 Millville Football & Athletic Club

1890 births
1980 deaths
Akron Indians coaches
Akron Indians players
Hammond Pros players
Minneapolis Marines coaches
Minneapolis Marines players
Minneapolis Red Jackets players
Rock Island Independents coaches
Rock Island Independents players
Sports coaches from Minneapolis
Players of American football from Minneapolis